Bionic Max is an animated comedy television series created by Thomas Digard and Emmanuel Klotz. Produced by Gaumont Animation for Gulli and Canal J, the series premiered on October 23, 2021.

Synopsis 

The series follows Max, the world's first bionic guinea pig, and his best friend Jean-Claude (often called JC), a goldfish, after they escaped the laboratory they're held in and make their way to Woodchuck Woods and how they try to fit in with local wildlife.

Episodes

 The Great Escape
 Max's Muffins
 Bionic Fax
 Biono Kicks
 Molehill Mountain
 Ouest Pie Story
 It Takes Two Thieves
 Woodchuck Chipper
 Bringing Down The House
 Get Smurt
 Fishy Gift
 Creature From the Max
 Bring Back Our Bionics
 Where Is Pesto?
 Reboot
 Utopian Wasteland
 Undercover
 Mama Chanterelle
 Battle of the Sands
 Handy Max
 Trapped in the Mall
 Be Happy
 Super Zero
 Bionic Flip
 Hiccup and Down
 Cleaning Max
 Mona's Party
 Last Resort
 No Time For Losers
 Lucky Day
 Kings of the Fair
 Spooky House
 Lettuce Go Camping
 Smells Like Feat
 Pet Rock
 Inflatable Max
 Clueless
 Surprise
 Treasure Hunt
 King Max
 Outlaws
 Don't Touch That Dial
 Identity Crisis
 Is There a Doctor in the House?
 Starstruck
 Worst Responders
 Follow The Guide
 Model Citizens
 Winners and Cruisers
 Panic Hotel
 Memory of a Goldfish
 Looking Out for No. 1 (and No. 6)

Production 
The series was greenlit for production by Gaumont Animation on September 27, 2018. Production on the show started between late 2018 and early 2019.

Broadcast 
The series premiered in France on Gulli & Canal J in Mid November. The show debuted in Africa on Cartoon Network Africa on 20 December 2021. As of March 2022, it can be seen on Pluto TV.

References 

2010s French animated television series
Gaumont Animation
French children's animated comedy television series
2019 French television series debuts